is a Japanese football player for Toho Titanium.

Club statistics
Updated to 23 February 2018.

References

External links
Profile at Azul Claro Numazu

j-league

1988 births
Living people
Kanagawa University alumni
Association football people from Kanagawa Prefecture
Japanese footballers
J2 League players
J3 League players
Japan Football League players
Mito HollyHock players
SC Sagamihara players
Azul Claro Numazu players
Association football midfielders